Meri Aawaz Suno is a 1981 Indian Hindi-language action thriller film, produced by G. Hanumantha Rao by Padmalaya Studios, presented by Krishna and directed by  S. V. Rajendra Singh Babu . It stars Jeetendra, Hema Malini,  Parveen Babi  and music composed by Laxmikant-Pyarelal. The film is a remake of the Kannada movie Antha (1981). The film became controversial upon its release, due to its portrayal of politicians. The film is recorded as a "Super Hit" at the box office.

Plot 

Inspector Sushil Kumar (Jeetendra) is an honest Police Officer; he has a happy life with his wife Sunitha (Hema Malini), who is Pregnant, and his mother. Kanwar Lal (again Jeetendra) is a smuggler, gangster, cold-blooded murderer, a rough and tough man who looks like Sushil, who is presently in prison serving life imprisonment. Kanwar Lal is a very important person in a dangerous gang, which is creating destruction in the country. CBI officials make a plan to send Sushil in the place of Kanwar to catch those dangerous gangsters who have high-level influence in the society; Sushil decides to take up the job by informing his family that he is going to London. Sushil changes his getup as Kanwar and creates the image that Kanwar has run away from the jail, finally he succeeds in joining the gang and starts collecting information regarding them. One day, Sushil's mother dies due to the heart attack, but he is not in a position to go because his secret might break out, and he controls himself for his country's sake. Sushil finally succeeds in his mission of collecting all the secrets of the gang, including higher officials of the government with evidence, but in the last minute, they come to know he is a police officer, but he safeguards the evidence, they keep him in their custody and subject him to a lot of violence and torture, finally, they kidnap Sunitha, and they kill her, who is carrying a baby, even then he wouldn't reveal the secret. At last, he escapes from them and reaches the higher officials with the evidence, but they also cheat him, then Sushil decides to take revenge against all of them, he removes all the anti-social elements and evil in the society and surrenders himself before Judiciary with evidence and asks for Justice, at which point the film concludes.

Cast 
Jeetendra as Inspector Sushil Kumar / Kanwarlal (Double Role)
Hema Malini as Mrs. Sunita Kumar
Parveen Babi as Rita
Kader Khan as Topiwala
Shakti Kapoor as Azaad
Ranjeet as Rony
Asrani as Bahadur
Vijay Arora as CBI Agent Kulwant
Om Shivpuri as CBI Officer Sangram Singh
Urmila Bhatt as Kamini Devi (Sushil's Mother) 
Pinchoo Kapoor as Minister
Raj Mehra as IGP Shankar Kumar
Rajan Haksar as Madan
Manmohan Krishna as Dawood
Tamanna as Shobha (Sushil's Sister) 
 Yunus Parvez as Halkatlal
 Jayshree T. as Bar Dancer
 Praveen Kumar as Justin

Soundtrack 
Lyrics: Anand Bakshi

Trivia 
Hema Malini, who plays the pregnant wife of Jeetendra in this movie, was actually pregnant during the shooting of the film. 

Sarika and Raj Babbar were offered roles initially, but they refused, and the roles were played by Tamanna (as Jeetendra's Sister) and Vijay Arora as Kulwant.

References

External links 
 
 

1981 action thriller films
1980s Hindi-language films
1981 films
Films directed by Rajendra Singh Babu
Films scored by Laxmikant–Pyarelal
Hindi remakes of Kannada films
Indian action thriller films